The equestrian statue of Christian IX, overlooking Christiansborg Ridebane on Slotsholmen in Copenhagen, Denmark, was created by Anne Marie Carl-Nielsen. Unveiled in 1927, it was the first equestrian statue of a monarch created by a woman sculptor.

Description
The statue shows Christian IX of Denmark on horseback, holding the reins of the horse in his left hand.

History

Construction of the third and current Christiansborg Palace began in 1907 after the second Christiansborg Palace had been destroyed in a fire in 1884. Following Christian IX's death on 29 January 1906, it was decided to commemorate him with an equestrian statue that would complement the equestrian statue of Frederick VII in front of the palace. An invited competition held in 1908 was won by Anne Marie Carl-Nielsen. She found the model for the horse in  Hannover, Germany. A wooden mockup of the sculpture was installed at Christiansborg Ridebane in 1911.

The statue was cast in royal bronze caster Carl and Poul Lauritz Rasmussen's foundry in Nørrebro. The plinth was designed by the architect Andreas Clemmesen and executed in stone carver  Scheller's workshop. The monument was unveiled on 15 November 1927.

References

External links

1927 sculptures
Buildings and structures completed in 1927
Cultural depictions of Christian IX of Denmark
Christian IX, Copenhagen
Monuments and memorials in Copenhagen
Outdoor sculptures in Copenhagen
Sculptures by Anne Marie Carl-Nielsen
Statues of men in Copenhagen
Christian IX